Kënga Magjike 08 was the eighth edition of the annual Albanian song competition, first held in 1999. It took place in the Palace of Congresses in Tirana, Albania. There were two semifinals (17 and 18 November 2006) and a final (19 November 2006). Fifty-three songs were heard in advance by the public at home, which narrowed them down to 39 songs by televoting. These songs competed in the semi-finals but only 19 made it to the final. In the end, Armend Rexhepagiqi won the first prize. Ledina Çelo was the runner-up. The winner was determined by the singers who voted for each other.

The results

Not in the semi finals

Voting procedure 

The singers voted for each other to determine the ranking of the songs, the jury determined most of the other prizes, while the televote decided the "Public's Prize" and the "Internet Prize".

The jury 

 Lindita Theodhori
 Monika Kryemadhi
 Xheraldina Vula
 Gentiana Ismajli
 Jean Philippe Favreau
 Riza Cerova
 Alfred Kaçinari
 Arian Cani
 Pandi Laço
 Geri Selenica
 Ilir Bibolli

Other prizes

Orchestra 

Playback was used.

Guest artists 

 Lindita Theodhori
 Saimir Pirgu
 Elena Risteska

Staff 

 Executive Producer: Anila Gjebrea
 Stage: Bashkim Zahaj
 Organizer: Ardit Gjebrea
 Directors: Agron Vulaj; Astrit Idrizi

Sources

External links 
 KM Official Website

2006
2006 in Albania